What Are You Looking At? is a forthcoming BBC comedy show, hosted by Jimmy Carr and produced by Hat Trick Productions. It is a clip show looking back at the week's television. A pilot was recorded starring Carr and the BBC plans to make a full series. However, the programme has already been attacked for being too similar to ITV1 show Harry Hill's TV Burp. The BBC claimed that, "Our show will be more spiky."

References

BBC television comedy
Television series by Hat Trick Productions